"Nookie" is a song by the American rap rock band Limp Bizkit, released as the first single from their second album Significant Other. It was released on June 15, 1999.

Lyrics and background
In a 2008 interview with British rock magazine Kerrang, guitarist Wes Borland said the following about how the lyrical content turned out: "The music was cool, but I didn't like the lyrics at all. The funny thing is that Nookie was actually the working title. When we were in the studio there was a porn magazine that had the word 'nookie' on the cover, so I was like, 'This song's called Nookie!', I never thought someone would actually run with it. I suppose it's all my fault."

Fred Durst said about the song, "It's about my ex-girlfriend, how she treated me like shit, and I couldn't leave her, wouldn't get over it," he said. "She screwed my friends and used me for my money. I tried to figure out why I did it, and I figured I did it all for the nookie."

Music video
The video was filmed in Long Island City.

In the music video, Durst sings the song while walking through city streets drawing a crowd of female followers as he leads them to a secret concert performance of the song in an alley. The band allowed hundreds of fans to participate, playing the song in front of the large crowd. All the guys went to one side of the stage, and the girls on the other side. When Durst sang the chorus at certain parts, he would hold out his microphone to the crowd, getting that particular side to sing. This was, according to Durst, to show that "guys go off hard, but girls go off even harder". At the end of the video, Durst gets arrested and taken away by the police for disturbing the peace.

Track listing
 "Nookie" – 4:28
 "Counterfeit" (Lethal Dose Remix) – 3:21
 "Counterfeit" (Phat Ass Remix) – 3:05
 "Nookie" (video)
 "Faith" (video)

Commercial performance
"Nookie" made Limp Bizkit extremely popular. The song aided in its parent album Significant Other getting certified 7× Platinum by the Recording Industry Association of America (RIAA). "Nookie" was their first single to chart on the Billboard Hot 100. It went to number 80 on July 31, 1999 and was on the chart for 11 weeks. "Nookie" also went to number 74 on the Radio Songs chart, number six on the Mainstream Rock chart, and number three on the Alternative Songs chart. "Nookie" went to number one on MTV's Total Request Live many times during the summer of 1999.

The song gained Bizkit its first Grammy nomination for Best Hard Rock Performance but lost to Metallica's "Whiskey In The Jar".

Reception
Pharrell Williams, while recording N.E.R.D.'s 2008 album Seeing Sounds, cited this song as part of the band's incentive and drive to record more energetic music, noting it as the last energetic hit single before the album's release. According to Stereogum, "aside from the infantile lyrics, the awful rapping, and the yelling, it’s really not that bad of a song". Author Dave Holmes wrote that "Nookie" is "terrible, yet the kids ate it up". In 2022, Louder Sound and Kerrang ranked the song number two and number three, respectively, on their lists of Limp Bizkit's greatest songs.

Charts

Citations

Bibliography

External links

1999 songs
1999 singles
Flip Records (1994) singles
Limp Bizkit songs
Music videos directed by Fred Durst
Song recordings produced by Terry Date
Songs written by Wes Borland
Songs written by Fred Durst
Songs written by John Otto (drummer)
Songs written by Sam Rivers (bassist)
Songs based on actual events